Free! is a 2013 anime series based on the light novel High Speed! written by Kōji Ōji and published the same year. Haruka Nanase and Rin Matsuoka are both gifted swimmers who are friends, but fierce rivals in the pool. Their lives and the lives of their friends are chronicled as they compete alongside and against one another from elementary school through high school. The third season has Haruka swimming at university and Rin being trained by a professional coach. Both face new challenges as they balance their personal lives against the demands of pro-sports and the task of growing into young adulthood.

The first season, titled Free! - Iwatobi Swim Club outside of Japan, was produced by Kyoto Animation and directed by Hiroko Utsumi with series composition by Masahiro Yokotani, character designs by Futoshi Nishiya, sound direction by Yota Tsuruoka and script writer, Masahiro Yokotani. The series aired 12 episodes between July 4 and September 26, 2013 on Tokyo MX and later aired on ABC, BS11 and TV Aichi. The series was streamed with English subtitles by Crunchyroll. A second season, Free! - Eternal Summer, aired 13 episodes between July 2 and September 24, 2014 and was simulcast by Crunchyroll and Funimation. An original video animation episode was included with the seventh Blu-ray Disc and DVD volume released on March 18, 2015. A third season, Free! - Dive to the Future, premiered on July 11, 2018.

For the first season, the opening theme is "Rage On" by Oldcodex, and the ending theme is "Splash Free" by Style Five (Nobunaga Shimazaki, Tatsuhisa Suzuki, Tsubasa Yonaga, Daisuke Hirakawa and Mamoru Miyano). The ending theme for episode 12 is "Ever Blue" by Style Five. For the second season, the opening theme is "Dried Up Youthful Fame" by Oldcodex, and the ending theme is "Future Fish" by Style Five. The ending theme for episode 13 is "Clear Blue Departure" by Shimazaki, Suzuki, Yonaga, Hirakawa, Miyano, Yoshimasa Hosoya, Kōki Miyata and Kenjiro Tsuda. For the third season, the opening theme is "Heading to Over" by Oldcodex, and the ending theme is "Gold Evolution" by Style Five.


Series overview

Episode list

Iwatobi Swim Club (2013)

Eternal Summer (2014)

Dive to the Future (2018)

FrFr!

FrFr! (pronounced "Free Free") is a series of shorts included as bonuses on home release of the series.

References

External links
 

Free!